Ethylvanillin is the organic compound with the formula (C2H5O)(HO)C6H3CHO. This colorless solid consists of a benzene ring with hydroxyl, ethoxy, and formyl groups on the 4, 3, and 1 positions, respectively. It is a homologue of vanillin, differing on the 3 position.

Preparation 
Ethylvanillin is prepared from catechol, beginning with ethylation to give guaethol (1). This ether condenses with glyoxylic acid to give the corresponding mandelic acid derivative (2), which by oxidation (3) and decarboxylation, gives ethylvanillin (4).

Application 
As a flavorant, ethylvanillin is about three times as potent as vanillin and is used in the production of chocolate.

The molecule revolutionized both the design and aesthetics of olfactory art; artist Jacques Guerlain added a large quantity of it to a bottle of Jicky (1889) perfume, creating the main accord for the perfume house's flagship fragrance, Shalimar (perfume) (1925). This is one of the earliest uses of synthetic molecules that freed scent artists from the limits of natural materials.

References 

Flavors
Phenol ethers
Hydroxybenzaldehydes
Perfume ingredients